The team dressage competition of the equestrian events at the 2019 Pan American Games was held on July 28 and July 29 at the Equestrian Club Militar La Molina in Lima.

Schedule

Results

37 competitors from 10 nations competed.

References

Equestrian at the 2019 Pan American Games